Mount Harry is a mountain  southeast of the FitzGerald Bluffs, Ellsworth Land, Antarctica. It is westernmost in a chain of small summits lying south-eastward of the bluffs. The feature lies within a group of nunataks photographed by Lincoln Ellsworth on November 23, 1935. It was mapped by the United States Geological Survey (USGS) from surveys and U.S. Navy aerial photographs from 1961 to 1966, and was named by the Advisory Committee on Antarctic Names for Jack L. Harry, a USGS topographic engineer and a member of the Marie Byrd Land Survey Party of 1967–68.

See also
 Mountains in Antarctica

References

Mountains of Ellsworth Land